Hon. Edward Aliedong Alhassan was the member of 1st parliament of the 4th Republic of Ghana for Damango-Daboya from 7 January 1993 to 6 January 1997.  Damango -Daboya is located in the Northern Region of Ghana. He was elected on the ticket of the National Democratic Congress in the 1992 Ghanaian general election.

Early life and education 
Edward Aliedong Alhassan was born on 15 April 1940. He had his education at Damongo Middle Boarding School, Govt. Secondary School. He obtained a diploma in statistics.

Career 
Aliedong Alhassan is a farmer and was a former member of Parliament for the Damango Daboya constituency in the Northern Region of Ghana

Politics 
Edward Aliedong Alhassan is a member of the National Democratic Congress. In 1992, he contested to represent the people of Damango and Daboya in the 1st parliament of the 4th Republic of Ghana. He was elected on the ticket of the National Democratic Congress and won the parliamentary seat with Eight Thousand Three Hundred and Fifty-Six votes which correspond to 35.80%. On 7th, January 1997, he was succeeded by Hon. Adam Mahama who became a member of the 2nd parliament of the 4th Republic of Ghana after winning the parliamentary seat in the 1996 Ghanaian general election.

Personal life 
He is a Christian.

References

1940 births
National Democratic Congress (Ghana) politicians
Ghanaian Christians
Living people
Tamale Senior High School alumni